The 1953–54 Soviet Cup was the fourth edition of the Soviet cup ice hockey tournament. 24 teams participated in the tournament, which was won by CDSA Moscow.

Tournament

First round

Second round

Third round

Quarterfinals

Semifinals

Final

External links
 Season on hockeyarchives.info
 Season on hockeyarchives.ru

Cup
Soviet Cup (ice hockey) seasons